Simon Dennis (born 21 February 1973) is a former Australian rules footballer who played for Richmond in the Australian Football League (AFL) in 1993. He was recruited from Syndal Tally Ho in the Victorian Amateur Football Association (VAFA) with the 44th selection in the 1992 Pre-season Draft.

References

External links

Living people
1973 births
Richmond Football Club players
Australian rules footballers from Victoria (Australia)